A trial is the presentation of information in a formal setting, usually a court.

Trial may also refer to:

An experiment, research study, or test
Bernoulli trial, any experiment with two possible random outcomes
Clinical trial, a medical research study
Evaluation, e.g., of software products in a trial version
Sea trial, the final stage of constructing and testing a ship

People with the name
MC Trials, an Australian hip hop MC with Funkoars
Antoine Trial (1737–1795), a French tenor whose name is used to describe a certain type of tenor voice ('trial')

Arts, entertainment, and media

Games
Mock Trial (card game), a 1910 card game invented by Lizzie Magie
Trials (series), a platform racing video game series
Trials (video game), a 2000 video game and the first in the above series

Music
Trial (album), a 2012 album by the Pillows
Trial (band), an American political straight-edge hardcore band from Seattle, Washington
Trials (band), an American heavy metal band from Chicago, Illinois
"Trial", scene 2 from the first act of Einstein on the Beach, composed by Philip Glass
Not to be confused with "Trial/Prison", which is Act 3 and Scene 1.

Other uses in arts, entertainment, and media
Trial (film), a 1955 American film
"Trial" (Batman: The Animated Series), a 1995 episode of Batman: The Animated Series
Trial, a 1955 novel by Don Mankiewicz
Trials (journal), an online open-access medical journal

Law
Bench trial, a trial in which a judge or panel of judges makes all decisions
Brought to trial,  to calendar a legal case for a hearing
Civil trial, a trial governed by civil procedure, to settle lawsuits or civil claims (non-criminal disputes)
Criminal trial, a trial governed by criminal procedure, aimed to achieve either the conviction or acquittal of the defendant
Jury trial, or trial by jury, a lawful proceeding in which a jury makes a decision or findings of fact
Mock trial, an act or imitation trial similar to a moot court, that simulates a lower-court trial (while a moot court simulates an appellate court hearing)
Trial by combat (also called wager of battle, trial by battle, or judicial duel), a method of Germanic law to settle accusations in the absence of witnesses or a confession in which two parties in dispute fought in single combat
Trial by ordeal, a trial by which the guilt or innocence of the accused is determined by subjecting them to a painful task

Sports
Classic trials, motoring competitions of skill and/or reliability
Motorcycle trials, an offroad competitive test using specialist motorcycles
Mountain bike trials, an obstacle bicycle competition, derived from the motorcycle sport
Off-roading, driving a specialized vehicle on unpaved roads, at low speed, and with emphasis on skill
:Category:Olympics trials, tournaments to select competitors for the Olympic Games
Time trials
Unicycle trials, an obstacle unicycle competition, derived from the bicycle and motorcycle sports

Linguistics
Trial (number), a grammatical number referring to 'three items'

Other uses
Trial (ship), a ship seized by convicts and wrecked in 1816

See also
 Bisha'a, trial by ordeal among the Bedouin
 Mistrial (disambiguation)
The Trial (disambiguation)
Trial by fire (disambiguation)
Trial Run (disambiguation)
Try (disambiguation)
Tryall (also known as Tryal), a ship which was wrecked in 1622